5700 may refer to:

In general
 A.D. 5700, a year in the 6th millennium CE
 5700 BC, a year in the 6th millennium BCE
 5700, a number in the 5000 (number) range

Rail
 GWR 5700 Class, a pannier tank steam locomotive train class
 Hanshin 5700 series, an electrical multiple unit train series
 Meitetsu 5700 series, an electric multiple unit train series
 Tobu 5700 series, a train type from Tobu Railway

Other uses
 5700 Homerus, an asteroid 
 Nokia 5700 XpressMusic, a smartphone

See also